Helmuth Johannsen (27 February 1920 – 3 November 1998) was a German professional football player and manager.

Johannsen played for St. Pauli, a club which he also served as vice-president for a year from 1987 to 1988,  but a war injury forced him to give up his playing career early. After World War II he went on to become a manager, most notably leading Eintracht Braunschweig to a surprising Bundesliga championship in 1966–67.

From early May to the end of June 1965 he spent a few weeks on loan from Braunschweig at Holstein Kiel taking the champions of the northern division of the then national second tier Regionalliga, through the matches of the promotion series for the Bundesliga, but finishing only third in a pool of four teams, behind Borussia Mönchengladbach around their young stars Günter Netzer and Jupp Heynckes, and SSV Reutlingen from the state of Baden-Württemberg.

He also worked in Switzerland, winning the Swiss championship in 1978 with Grasshopper Club Zürich, and also reaching the semi-finals of the UEFA Cup the same year.

Honours
Eintracht Braunschweig
 Bundesliga: 1967

Grasshoppers
 Swiss Nationalliga A: 1978

Individual
 Swiss Manager of the Year: 1984

References

External links
 

1920 births
1998 deaths
Footballers from Hamburg
German footballers
German football managers
German expatriate football managers
FC St. Pauli players
1. FC Saarbrücken managers
Eintracht Braunschweig managers
Hannover 96 managers
SV Röchling Völklingen managers
Tennis Borussia Berlin managers
VfL Bochum managers
FC St. Gallen managers
Grasshopper Club Zürich managers
Bundesliga managers
2. Bundesliga managers
Holstein Kiel managers
German military personnel of World War II

Association footballers not categorized by position